Victoria Rodríguez (born 22 April 1995) is a Mexican professional tennis player.

Rodríguez has won nine singles titles and 21 doubles titles on the ITF Women's Circuit, as well as one WTA 125 doubles title. She has reached career-high WTA rankings of 216 in singles and world No. 113 in doubles.

Rodríguez made her WTA Tour debut at the 2013 Abierto Mexicano, partnering Marcela Zacarías in doubles. The Mexican pair won their first-round match against fellow Mexican wildcards Ximena Hermoso and Ana Sofía Sánchez, only to lose in the quarterfinals to the Spanish fourth seeds Lourdes Domínguez Lino and Arantxa Parra Santonja, who went on to win the title.

Playing for Mexico Fed Cup team, Rodríguez has a win–loss record of 5–7 (doubles: 4–4) as of June 2021.

WTA 125 tournament finals

Doubles: 1 (1 title)

ITF finals

Singles: 19 (9 titles, 10 runner–ups)

Doubles: 42 (21 titles, 21 runner–ups)

References

External links
 
 
 

1995 births
Living people
People from Durango City
Mexican female tennis players
Sportspeople from Durango
Pan American Games silver medalists for Mexico
Tennis players at the 2015 Pan American Games
Pan American Games medalists in tennis
Central American and Caribbean Games gold medalists for Mexico
Competitors at the 2014 Central American and Caribbean Games
Central American and Caribbean Games medalists in tennis
Medalists at the 2015 Pan American Games
21st-century Mexican women